In Europe and the United States, a cigarette girl is a person who sells or provides cigarettes from a tray held by a neck strap. They may also carry cigars and other items like candy, snacks, and chewing gum on their trays.

Uniform 
The most common uniform is a red and black short saloon-style skirt above the knee dress accompanied with a matching pillbox hat, but different colors and styles are possible. Another title for a cigarette girl is candy girl. 

Aside from serving cigarettes and other novelties, the attractive girls acted as eye candy and were often employed to flirt with male customers as well. Cigarette girls usually consented in the hopes of getting tips from wealthy businessmen.

Popularity and decline
The modern image of cigarette girl developed in the 1920s with the urbanization of America. Though largely not seen other than in speakeasies and supper clubs, cigarette girls were frequently shown in Hollywood films and soon became well-established among the general public. The cigarette girl of the nightclub became a staple figure of film and theatre.

With the repeal of Prohibition in 1933, speakeasies across America closed and cigarettes girls soon found employment in more popular business destinations.

Cigarette girls were a common sight in restaurants, clubs, bars, airports, and casinos in the 1930s and 1940s in the United States. From the end of World War II to the 1950s, cigarette girls further expanded into sporting events and the lobbies of theaters and music halls during intermissions. 

With the rise of cigarette machines in the mid-1950s, however, venue owners no longer needed to seek out cigarette girls who worked for a paycheck, and the girls largely vanished from the public eye. There are still some casinos and nightclubs that still use cigarette girls today, especially on the Las Vegas Strip.

See also

References 

Service occupations
Gendered occupations
Obsolete occupations
Casinos
Cigarettes